Ludhiana West tehsil has 125 villages and is in the Ludhiana district, Punjab, India.

A

 Akalgarh Urf Lalton Khurd
 Alamgir (Ludhiana West)
 Allowal (Ludhiana West)
 Assi Khurd
 Ayali Kalan
 Ayali Khurd

Back to top

B

 Bagga Kalan
 Bagga Khurd
 Bahadarke
 Bains (Ludhiana West)
 Balloke
 Ballowal
 Baraich
 Baran Hara
 Barewal Dogran
 Basaimi
 Beela
 Bhanohar
 Bhattian (Ludhiana West)
 Bholewal Jadid
 Bholewal Qadim
 Birmi
 Bounker Dogran
 Brahman Majra
 Bulara
 Burj Lambra
 Burj Man Kaur

Back to top

C

 Chak Kalan (Ludhiana West)
 Chaminda (Ludhiana West)
 Changan (Ludhiana West)
 Chark
 Chhapar (Ludhiana West)
 Chhokar (Ludhiana West)
 Chuharpura

Back to top

D

 Dad (Ludhiana West)
 Dakha (Ludhiana West)
 Dangora
 Dewatwal
 Dhaipai
 Dhandra
 Dhat (Ludhiana West)
 Dhurkot (Ludhiana West)
 Doleh (Ludhiana West)
 Dolon Kalan
 Dolon Khurd
 Dugri

Back to top

F

 Fatehgarh Gujjran

Back to top

G

 Ghuman
 Garha (Ludhiana West)
 Gaunspur (Ludhiana West)
 Ghungrana
 Gill
 Goindwal (Ludhiana West)
 Gorsian Hakamrai
 Gujjarwal (Ludhiana West)

Back to top

H

 Hambran
 Harnampura
 Hassanpur (Ludhiana West)
 Himayunpura
 Hussainpura

Back to top

I

 Isewal

Back to top

J

 Jainpur
 Jangpur
 Jarahan
 Jaspal Bangar
 Jassian
 Jhamat
 Jhameri
 Jhanda (Ludhiana West)

Back to top

K

 Kadian (Ludhiana West)
 Kailpur
 Kaind
 Karimpur (Ludhiana West)
 Khaira
 Khandur
 Khanjarwal
 Khanpur (Ludhiana West)
 Khark (Ludhiana West)
 Kheri (Ludhiana West)

Back to top

L

 Lehra(Ludhiana West)
 Ladian Kalan
 Ladian Khurd
 Lalton Kalan
 Latala (Ludhiana West)
 Laudhowal
 Lohgarh (Ludhiana West)

Back to top

M

 Mahmudpura
 Majara Kalan
 Majra Khurd
 Malakpur
 Manakwal
 Mandiani
 Manj (Ludhiana West)
 Mannewal
 Mansuran (Ludhiana West)
 Mehtabgarh
 Mohi (Ludhiana West)
 Mor Karima
 Mullanpur (Ludhiana West)

Back to top

N

 Narangwal
 Nurpur Bet

Back to top

P

 Pamal
 Pamali
 Pandori (Ludhiana West)
 Phagguwal
 Phagla
 Phallewal
 Phullanwal

Back to top

Q

 Qutabewal Araian
 Qutbewal Gujjran

Back to top

R

 Rajapur (Ludhiana West)
 Rajjowal
 Rajpura Urf Hussainpura
 Ranguwala
 Ranian
 Raqba
 Rattan (Ludhiana West)
 Rurka (Ludhiana West)

Back to top

S

 Sahuli
 Salempur (Ludhiana West)
 Sangowal (Ludhiana West)
 Saraba
 Sarih (Ludhiana West)
 Shehzad (Ludhiana West)

Back to top

T

 Talwandi Kalan (Ludhiana West)
 Talwandi Khurd
 Talwara (Ludhiana West)
 Thakarwal

Back to top

References

Villages in Ludhiana district